There is a Polish diaspora in Mexico. According to the 2005 intercensal estimate, there were 971 Polish citizens living in Mexico. Furthermore, by the estimate of the Jewish community, there may be as many as 15,000 descendants of Jewish migrants from Poland living in Mexico.

Migration history

The first Poles arrived in Mexico during the French intervention in Mexico. In May 1942, Mexico declared war on Germany. To show solidarity with the Polish people, Mexico accepted in 1943 over 2,000 Polish refugees including 1,400 Polish orphans to settle in the state of Guanajuato in central Mexico. After the war, many of the refugees remained to live in Mexico.

Polish-Mexicans

Notable Polish Mexicans

Notable Mexicans with Polish origins

Athletics

Helen Plaschinski, Mexican former Olympics freestyle swimmer for Summer 1980 of Polish descent.
Angelica Zawadzki, Mexican sprint canoer of Polish descent.

Artist/Musician

Henryk Szeryng, Polish-born Mexican violinist and composer.
David Ostrosky, Mexican actor to Polish mother.
Eva Maria Zuk, Polish-born Mexican piano concertist.
Fanny Rabel, Polish-born Mexican artist.
Zbigniew Paleta, Polish-born Mexican violinist and composer for telenovelas and the Cinema of Mexico.
Pawel Anaszkiewicz, Polish-born Mexican artist.
Tamara de Lempicka, Polish-born Mexican Art Deco painter.

Movies/television/media

Dominika Paleta, Polish-born Mexican actress.
Ludwik Margules, Polish-born Mexican theatre, opera and film director.
Kristoff Raczyñski, Russian-born Mexican actor, film producer, screenwriter and TV host of Polish descent.
Maya Mishalska, Polish-born Mexican actress, violinist and TV presenter.
Alicja Bachleda-Curuś, Mexican-born Polish actress and singer.
Helen Kleinbort Krauze, Polish Jewish-born Mexican journalist.
León Krauze, Mexican journalist, author and news anchor of Polish descent.
Arleta Jeziorska, Polish-born Mexican actress of films and telenovelas.
Alfredo Ripstein, Mexican film producer to Polish Jewish father.
Mauricio Kleiff, Mexican screenwriter of Polish descent.

Literature

Rodolfo Usigli, Mexican playwright to Italian father and Polish mother.

Politics

Julio Boltvinik Kalinka, Mexican academic and politician of Polish descent.
David Goldbaum, Mexican surveyor and politician to Polish Jewish father of German and Polish descent.

Science

Sara Topelson de Grinberg, Polish-born Mexican architect to Russian father and Polish mother.
Jerzy Rzedowski, Polish-born Mexican botanist.
José Woldenberg, Mexican political scientist and sociologist to Polish father and Lithuanian mother.
Arturo Warman, Mexican anthropologist to Polish Jewish parents.

Miscellaneous

Moisés Kaiman, Polish-born Mexican Rabbi for the Jewish Community of Monterrey, Mexico.
Arturo Antonio Szymanski Ramírez, Mexican prelate of the Roman Catholic Church of Polish descent.

See also

 Mexico–Poland relations
 White Mexicans

References

External links 
Mexico and Poland: Centuries of Cultural Relations

 
European Mexican
Mexico
Immigration to Mexico
Polish diaspora in North America
Mexico–Poland relations
Ethnic groups in Mexico